Delfina Bunge de Gálvez (December 24, 1881 –  March 30, 1952) was an Argentine writer, poet, essayist and philanthropist.

Biography
Born in Buenos Aires, she was the daughter of Raimundo Octavio Bunge, quondam justice of the Supreme Court of Argentina, and María Luisa Justa Rufina de Arteaga. She had at least three brothers: Carlos Octavio Bunge, publicist, sociologist and historian, as well as Augusto Bunge and Alejandro Bunge, who were involved in the country's affairs; she also had a sister, Julia Bunge de Uranga. She was educated in the Colegio del Sagrado Corazón.

Bunge married Manuel Gálvez. Some of her first verses which were published in magazines and newspapers, were in the French language. Her first volume of poems, Simplement, appeared in Paris in 1911. In 1933, in collaboration with her sister, Julia, Bunge published El arca de Noé; in 1918, she issued a second book of verse in French, La nouvelle moisson, in Buenos Aires; and later, she published Historia y novena de Nuestra Senora de Lourdes.

During World War II, Bunge published anti-semitic works that promoted conspiracies that Jews sought to undermine Christian society.

She died in Alta Gracia in 1952, and appeared on an Argentine stamp in 1983.

Selected works 
 Simplement (poesía en francés), París, Alphonse Lemerre, 1911.
 El Arca de Noé: libro de lectura. Segundo grado, Buenos Aires, Cabaut, 1916.
 Cuentos de Navidad, ( Cuento: El oro el incienso y la mirra de D.B.) junto a otros cuentistas, Buenos Aires, sin edición, 1917.
 La Nouvelle moisson, (poesía en francés) Buenos Aires : Cooperativa Editorial Limitada, 1918.
 Poesías, Buenos Aires : Ediciones Selectas América, 1920.
 Tierras del mar azul, viajes, Buenos Aires, América Unida, 1920.
 El Alma de los niños, religión, Buenos Aires : Agencia General de Librería y Publicaciones, 1921.
 Las Imágenes del infinito, ensayo, Buenos Aires : Agencia General de Librería y Publicaciones, 1922. (Premio Municipal)
 El Tesoro del mundo, Buenos Aires : Mercatali, impr., 1923.
 Oro, incienso y mirra, religión, Buenos Aires, Mercatali, (Maubé?), 1924. 
 Los Malos tiempos de hoy, Buenos Aires, Buenos Aires, 1926.
 Escuela: lecturas escolares para tercer grado, escrito junto a Julia Bunge, Buenos Aires, Cabaut, 1933.
 Hogar, junto a Julia Bunge, Buenos Aires, Cabaut, 1933.
 Lectura para cuarto grado escolar. Buenos Aires: Cabaut, 1933
 Hogar y patria:, libro de lectura para 5º grado, Es el "Libro quinto" de la serie: *"Lecturas graduadas". - Incluye una "Carta Epílogo" del Dr. Ernesto Padilla, Buenos Aires, H.M.E., 1933.
 El Reino de Dios, Buenos Aires : Santa Catalina, 1934.
 Oro, incienso y mirra, cuentos, 2da Edición, Buenos Aires, Cabaut y Cía., 1935. 
 La Belleza en la vida cotidiana, ensayos, Santiago de Chile, Ercilla, 1936.
 Lecturas, cuarto grado escolar, Buenos Aires, Cabaut, 1936.
 Iniciación literaria, Buenos Aires, H.M.E., 1937.
 Nociones de religión católica: catecismo único: mi primer libro de religión, [s.l.] : [s.n.], 1938.
 Viaje alrededor de mi infancia. ensayo Buenos Aires. Imp. López. 1938.
 Dios y yo, folleto 64p., Buenos Aires, El Libro, 1940.
 Catolicismo de Guerra, (Folleto, 16p.), Buenos Aires, 1942.
 Las Mujeres y la vocación, Buenos Aires, Poblet, 1943.
 La Vida en los sueños, Buenos Aires, Emecé, 1943, 1951.
 En Torno a León Bloy : Algunos aspectos de la vida y la muerte de León Bloy, Biografías, Buenos Aires : Club de Lectores, 1944.
 Cura de estrellas, (máximas), Buenos Aires : Emecé, 1949.
 Viaje a rededor de mi infancia, Buenos Aires, Peuser, 1956. Cuatro ediciones.
 Poesías, prol. José Enrique Rodó y Alfonsina Storni, trad. , (s.l.) : (s.n.), (1920).
 Seis villancicos de Navidad y Reyes, (s.l.) : (s.n.), (19--).

References

1881 births
1952 deaths
Writers from Buenos Aires
Argentine women poets
Argentine writers in French
Argentine philanthropists
Argentine essayists
Argentine women essayists
20th-century Argentine poets
20th-century essayists
20th-century Argentine women writers
20th-century Argentine writers
20th-century philanthropists